Eating blood may refer to:

 Hematophagy, animals feeding on blood
 Blood as food, humans eating blood